Kario Gahanwar is a town in Badin District in the Sindh province of Pakistan. It is famous for its agriculture. The main crops of the town are rice, cotton, sunflowers and sugarcane.

Nearby towns
These are the closest towns with coordinates to this town:
 Talhar (14.0 miles / 22.6 km E/NE)
 Mātli (16.2 miles / 26.0 km N)
 Bulri (17.3 miles / 27.8 km W/NW)
 Badīn (18.7 miles / 30.0 km SE)
 Rajo Khanani (19.2 miles / 30.8 km NE)
 Tando Muhammad Khan (21.2 miles / 34.1 km N/NW)
 Mirpur Bathoro (22.8 miles / 36.7 km W/SW)
 Tando Bagho (23.2 miles / 37.4 km E)
 Daro (26.5 miles / 42.6 km W)
 Tando Ghulām Ali (27.1 miles / 43.7 km NE)

Notable people 
Fazil Rahu

References

Sources
https://www.sindhidunya.com/golarchi-taluka-newly-populated-sindh/

Populated places in Sindh
Badin District